The Large Horse (French: Le Grand cheval) is a 1914-31 bronze sculpture by French artist Raymond Duchamp-Villon, installed at the Museum of Fine Arts, Houston's (MFAH) Lillie and Hugh Roy Cullen Sculpture Garden in Houston, Texas, in the United States.

Description
Raymond Duchamp-Villon's Le cheval was designed in 1914. An enlargement from the original plaster made by Duchamp-Villon to 1 meter, was performed under the supervision of the artists brother Jacques Villon in 1930-1931.

The Large Horse measures 59 x 60 1/4 x 37 3/4 inches. The sculpture was purchased by the museum with funds from its Board of Trustees. Houston Press called the work "semi-abstract with some cubistic elements but that, more important, roars with its own energy. It reeks of perfection, of a difficult artistic goal not only met but exceeded, and is fascinating and witty. It's clear that we are seeing the talent of genius."

See also
 1914 in art
 Cubist sculpture
 List of public art in Houston

References

1914 establishments in Texas
1914 sculptures
Abstract sculptures in Texas
Animal sculptures in Texas
Bronze sculptures in Texas
Cubist sculptures
Horses in art
Lillie and Hugh Roy Cullen Sculpture Garden
Statues in Houston
Works by French people